Andrew Schepard is an American legal scholar and  Sidney and Walter Siben Distinguished Professor of Family Law at Hofstra University.
He is a former editor-in-chief of Family Court Review.

References

Living people
American legal scholars
Hofstra University faculty
Year of birth missing (living people)